Jim Hamilton may refer to:

People 

Jim Hamilton (baseball) (1922–1977), American baseball player
Jim Hamilton (footballer, born 1966), Scottish footballer (Arbroath, Stirling Albion, Dumbarton)
Jim Hamilton (footballer, born 1976), Scottish footballer (Heart of Midlothian, Aberdeen, Dundee United, Motherwell)
Jim Hamilton (ice hockey) (born 1957), Canadian ice hockey player (Pittsburgh Penguins)
Jim Hamilton (rugby union) (born 1982), Scottish rugby union player
Jim Hamilton (politician), member of the Montana House of Representatives
Jimmy Hamilton (1917–1994), American jazz musician
Jimmy Hamilton (curler), Scottish curler
Jimmy Hamilton (footballer, born 1904) (1904–?), English footballer
Sunny Jim Hamilton (fl. 1911), American baseball player

Places 
Jim Hamilton–L.B. Owens Airport, an airport in South Carolina

See also 
James Hamilton (disambiguation)
Jamie Hamilton (disambiguation)
Hamish Hamilton, Gaelic version of the name James Hamilton

Hamilton, Jim